Northside High School  was a high school in northern Memphis, Tennessee that closed in 2016. It was operated by Shelby County Schools and was previously in Memphis City Schools.

As of September 2019, Urban Renaissance Inc. wants to buy the building to provide space for community groups and small businesses as the meal preparation that had been done there by Shelby County would be moving to another location.

This school was built in 1968 in the Memphis City Schools system and served almost 350 students and 200 teachers in its first school year.

Notable alumni
Mike Hegman
Juicy J
Sharika Nelvis
James Wade (basketball)

References

Schools in Memphis, Tennessee
High schools in Tennessee
1968 establishments in Tennessee